The Byzantine Catholic Metropolis of Pittsburgh is a metropolitan province for Eastern Catholics of the Byzantine Rite in the United States of America, with specific jurisdiction over several communities that originated (in terms of their ancestry) from the regions of Carpathian Ruthenia, Slovakia, Hungary and former Yugoslavia. Its membership thus includes several Byzantine Catholic groups, mainly among Rusyn Americans, Slovak Americans, Hungarian Americans, and Croatian Americans. Since 2022, the Exarchate of Saints Cyril and Methodius of Toronto in Canada has also been under the provincial jurisdiction the Metropolis of Pittsburgh rather than the Slovak Greek Catholic Church.

Within the ecclesiastical structure of Eastern Catholic Churches, it is classified as part of the Ruthenian Greek Catholic Church, that does not have an unified organization.

Organization
The Metropolia, which is structured as an ecclesiastical province, itself has five components:
 Byzantine Catholic Archeparchy of Pittsburgh (60,200 faithful, 84 parishes, 83 priests)
 Ruthenian Catholic Eparchy of Parma (12,401 faithful, 37 parishes, 38 priests)
 Ruthenian Catholic Eparchy of Passaic (24,031 faithful, 89 parishes, 84 priests)
 Byzantine Catholic Eparchy of Phoenix (2,849 faithful, 19 parishes, 25 priests)
 Slovak Catholic Exarchate of Saints Cyril and Methodius of Toronto [Canada] (4,800 faithful, 4 parishes).

Although Rusyn Americans constitute the majority of members of the Metropolia, the Church has ordinary jurisdiction over the faithful of certain Churches within the Slavic Tradition of the Byzantine Rite that do not have an established hierarchy in the United States, specifically those of the Hungarian, Slovak, and Croatian Greek-Catholic Churches.

When the Ruthenian Catholic Church in Europe was under atheistic Communist rule, and because of persecution, unable to organize publicly, the impossibility of regular communication with it meant that the distant American Metropolia, unable to be treated as a normal metropolia of an Eastern Rite Catholic Church (canons 133–139 of the Code of Canons of the Eastern Churches), has been treated as a sui iuris (autonomous) Metropolitan Church (canons 155–173 of the Code of Canons of the Eastern Churches). The Holy See's Annuario Pontificio has, however, always listed it not as a separate particular Church but as a Metropolia of the Ruthenian Church.

History
In 1924, an Apostolic Exarchate was created for the Ruthenian-Rite Catholics in the USA, with ancestry from the regions of Carpathian Ruthenia and other parts of the former Kingdom of Hungary. In 1963, the Apostolic Exarchate was divided in two parts, each transformed into a diocese (eparchy): one centered in Pittsburgh and the other in Passaic. Both remained under direct jurisdiction of the pope, and were officially defined as observing the Ruthenian Rite.

Ruthenian Catholic Metropolis of Munhall
In 1969, the Eparchy of Pittsburgh was raised in rank and renamed as the Archeparchy of Munhall, and in the same time a metropolitan province was created and named the Ruthenian Catholic Metropolis of Munhall, encompassing also the Eparchy of Passaic and the newly created Eparchy of Parma. The new Metropolis and all of its eparchies were officially defined as observing the Ruthenian Rite.

Byzantine Catholic Metropolis of Pittsburgh
In 1977, the Archeparchy and the Metropolis were renamed and redefined from Munhall of the Ruthenians to Pittsburgh of the Byzantines, and thus continued as the Byzantine Catholic Metropolis of Pittsburgh. In 1981, the Eparchy of Van Nuys was created and officially defined as observing the Byzantine Rite. In 2009, its seat was moved from Van Nuys to Phoenix, and its name was changed to the Eparchy of Phoenix.

In January 2007, Metropolitan Basil Schott, Archbishop of Pittsburgh promulgated a major revision of two of the major Divine Liturgies (Chrysostom and Basil) of the Byzantine Catholic Church.

Seminary
The church's Byzantine Catholic Seminary of SS. Cyril and Methodius, established in 1950, is located on Pittsburgh, Pennsylvania's Observatory Hill. In addition to the training of priests, it offers a program in Deacon Formation as well as a Cantor's Institute.

List of Bishops and Apostolic Administrators
 Gabriel Martyak (1916–1924) (Apostolic Administrator)
 Basil Takach (June 15, 1924 – May 13, 1948)
 Daniel Ivancho (May 13, 1948 – December 12, 1954)
 Nicholas Elko (February 5, 1955 – December 22, 1967)
 Edward V. Rosack (July 3, 1967 - December 22, 1967) (Apostolic Administrator)
 Stephen Kocisko (March 5, 1968 – June 12, 1991)
 Thomas Dolinay (June 12, 1991 – April 13, 1993)
 Michael Dudick (April 1993 - February 1995) (Administrator of the Metropolitan Church of Pittsburgh)
 John Bilock (April 20, 1993 – September 8, 1994) (Apostolic Administrator  - Archeparchy of Pittsburgh)
 Russell Duker (September 1994 – November 15, 1994) (Apostolic Administrator - Archeparchy of Pittsburgh)
 Judson Procyk (February 7, 1995 – April 15, 2001)
 Andrew Pataki (April 2001 - June 2002) (Administrator of the Metropolitan Church of Pittsburgh)
 John Kudrick  (May 2001 – July 9, 2002) (Apostolic Administrator - Archeparchy of Pittsburgh)
 Basil Schott (July 9, 2002 – June 10, 2010)
 William Skurla (June 10, 2010 – April 18, 2012) (Administrator of the Metropolitan Church of Pittsburgh)
 Eugene Yackanich (June 2010 – April 18, 2012) (Apostolic Administrator - Archeparchy of Pittsburgh)
 William C. Skurla (April 18, 2012 – present)

See also
List of the Catholic bishops of the United States#Metropolia of Pittsburgh for the Ruthenians
 Slovak Greek Catholic Church
 Basil Shereghy
 St. John the Baptist Byzantine Catholic Cathedral (Pittsburgh)
 St. John Chrysostom Byzantine Catholic Church (Pittsburgh)
 Mount Saint Macrina

References

Sources

External links
The statistical information given above has been taken from the 2005 edition of the Annuario Pontificio.
Byzantine Catholic Metropolitan Church of Pittsburgh at Catholic-Hierarchy.org
Byzantine Catholic Church in America - unofficial website
Metropolia of Pittsburgh
 The Archeparchy of Pittsburgh
The Eparchy of Passaic
 The Eparchy of Parma

Ruthenian Catholic Church
Catholic Church in the United States
 
Christianity in Pittsburgh
Rusyn-American culture in Pennsylvania
Rusyn-American history
1924 establishments in Pennsylvania